Good Hope is a city in Cullman County, Alabama, United States. As of the 2010 census, the population of the city was 2,264. It incorporated in April 1962.

Geography
Good Hope is located near the center of Cullman County at 34°6'32" North, 86°52'2" West (34.108777, -86.867164). It is bordered by Cullman, the county seat, to the northeast. Interstate 65 passes through the city, with access from Exit 304. I-65 leads south  to Birmingham and north  (via Interstate 565) to Huntsville.

Demographics

2000 census
At the 2000 census there were 1,966 people, 764 households, and 583 families living in the city. The racial makeup of the city was 98.83% White, 0.10% Black or African American, 0.20% Native American, 0.15% Asian, 0.31% from other races, and 0.41% from two or more races. 1.12% of the population were Hispanic or Latino of any race.
Of the 764 households 35.5% had children under the age of 18 living with them, 62.2% were married couples living together, 11.0% had a female householder with no husband present, and 23.6% were non-families. 20.8% of households were one person and 6.3% were one person aged 65 or older. The average household size was 2.57 and the average family size was 2.98.

The age distribution was 25.6% under the age of 18, 9.7% from 18 to 24, 30.7% from 25 to 44, 22.6% from 45 to 64, and 11.3% 65 or older. The median age was 35 years. For every 100 females, there were 96.8 males. For every 100 females age 18 and over, there were 95.7 males.

The median household income was $33,274 and the median family income  was $39,063. Males had a median income of $25,809 versus $20,762 for females. The per capita income for the city was $16,602. 7.0% of the population and 5.1% of families were below the poverty line. 5.7% of those under the age of 18 and 13.9% of those 65 and older were living below the poverty line.

2010 census

At the 2010 census there were 2,264 people, 847 households, and 631 families living in the town. The racial makeup of the city was 92.7% White, 0.3% Black or African American, 0.4% Native American, 0.5% Asian, 5.2% from other races, and 1.1% from two or more races. 7.7% of the population were Hispanic or Latino of any race.
Of the 847 households 34.2% had children under the age of 18 living with them, 57.3% were married couples living together, 12.4% had a female householder with no husband present, and 25.5% were non-families. 22.2% of households were one person and 8.1% were one person aged 65 or older. The average household size was 2.67 and the average family size was 3.12.

The age distribution was 26.9% under the age of 18, 8.5% from 18 to 24, 26.9% from 25 to 44, 24.6% from 45 to 64, and 13.1% 65 or older. The median age was 36.5 years. For every 100 females, there were 101.2 males. For every 100 females age 18 and over, there were 100.0 males.

The median household income was $45,784 and the median family income  was $48,080. Males had a median income of $50,750 versus $27,865 for females. The per capita income for the city was $22,771. 19.3% of the population and 13.7% of families were below the poverty line. 29.7% of those under the age of 18 and 21.4% of those 65 and older were living below the poverty line.

2020 census

As of the 2020 United States census, there were 2,483 people, 845 households, and 604 families residing in the city.

Education
Good Hope Primary School- Grades PK-2.
Good Hope Elementary School- Grades 3–5.
Good Hope Middle School- Grades 6–8.
Good Hope High School- serves 395 students in grades 9-12. Its mascot is the Raiders, and its school colors are red and white. Its sports teams are part of the Alabama High School Athletic Association Class 4A.

All four schools are members of the Cullman County Board of Education.

References

External links
City of Good Hope official website

Cities in Cullman County, Alabama
Cities in Alabama